The dorsal radioulnar ligament (posterior radioulnar ligament) extends between corresponding surfaces on the dorsal aspect of the distal radioulnar articulation.

References 

Ligaments of the upper limb